Cheeseborough may refer to:

People 
Chandra Cheeseborough (born 1959), American track and field athlete
Barbara Cheeseborough (1946–2013), American fashion model

Places 
 Cheeseborough, Queensland, Australia
 Cheeseborough, a community of Leeds and the Thousand Islands, Ontario, Canada

See also
Cheseborough (disambiguation)
Chesebrough (disambiguation)
Cheesebrough (disambiguation)